Ba Yongshan (born 6 August 1961) is a Chinese archer. He competed in the men's individual event at the 1984 Summer Olympics.

References

1961 births
Living people
Chinese male archers
Olympic archers of China
Archers at the 1984 Summer Olympics
Place of birth missing (living people)
20th-century Chinese people